The following is a timeline of the history of the city of Matanzas, Cuba.

Prior to 20th century

 1693 - City laid out.
 1694 - Ayuntamiento (town council) established.
 1813 - Francisco Camero sets up first publishing business in Matanzas.
 1815 - Mantanzas becomes capital of its department.
 1818 - Custom house built.
 1835 - Public library established.
 1844
  executed.
 Hurricane occurs.
 1846 - Hurricane occurs.
 1853 - William R. King takes the oath for Vice President of the United States in Matanzas.
 1863 - Sauto Theater opens.
 1870 - Hermitage of Monteserrate established on hill near city.
 1873 - Matanzas Baseball Club formed.
 1880 - November: International exhibition held in Matanzas.
 1884 - El Correo de Matanzas newspaper begins publication.
 1892 - Population: 27,000.
 1894 - El Club de Ciclistas de Matanzas active (bicycle club) (approximate date).
 1899 - Population: 36,374.
 1900 - El Heraldo Espanol newspaper begins publication.

20th century

 1907 - Population: 36,009 city.
 1912 - Roman Catholic Diocese of Matanzas established.
 1916 - Teatro Velasco opens.
 1919 - Population: 62,638.
 1952 - Los Muñequitos de Matanzas rumba group formed.
 1966 - Population: 81,000.
 1968 - Archivo Historico Provincial de Matanzas (archives) established.
 1976 - Centro Universitario de Matanzas and Instituto Superior Pedagogico de Matanzas established.
 1978 -  (garden) established.
 1984 - Population: 104,583 (estimate).
 1999 - Population: 124,754.

21st century

 2014 - Population: 136,486.

See also
 Matanzas history
 Timelines of other cities in Cuba: Camagüey, Cienfuegos, Guantánamo, Havana, Holguín, Santiago de Cuba

References

Bibliography

in English
 
 
 
 

in Spanish
 
 
 
 
 
 
 
  (chronology)
 
  (fulltext)

External links

 
 Items related to Matanzas, various dates (via Digital Public Library of America)
 

Matanzas
Matanzas
Cuba-related lists
Matanzas
Years in Cuba